The 2011 KNSB Dutch Allround Championships in speed skating were held at the Thialf ice stadium in Heerenveen, Netherlands, from 27 to 29 December 2010. Although the tournament was held in 2010 it was the 2011 edition as it is part of the 2010–11 speed skating season.

Schedule

Medalists

Allround

Distance

Men's results

Final results

 NQ = not qualified for the 10000 m
 pr = persenol record

Source: Schaatsstatistieken.nl  & Schaatsupdate.nl: 500 m, 5000 m, 1500 m, 10000 m

Women's results

Final results

 NQ = not qualified for the 5000 m
 DQ = disqualified
 DNS = did not start
 pr = persenol record

Source: Schaatsstatistieken.nl  & Schaatsupdate.nl: 500 m, 5000 m, 1500 m, 10000 m

References

KNSB Dutch Allround Championships
KNSB Dutch Allround Championships
2011 Allround
KNSB Dutch Allround Championships, 2011